The Philadelphia Classic was a golf tournament on the Nike Tour. It ran from 1995 to 1997. In 1995 and 1996 it was played at Philmont Country Club in Huntingdon Valley, Pennsylvania. In 1997 it was played at Laurel Creek Country Club in Mount Laurel, New Jersey.

In 1997 the winner earned $36,000.

Winners

Former Korn Ferry Tour events
Golf in Pennsylvania
Golf in New Jersey
Sports in Philadelphia
Recurring sporting events established in 1995
Recurring sporting events disestablished in 1997
1995 establishments in Pennsylvania
1997 disestablishments in New Jersey